Reshma Aur Shera (translation: Reshma and Shera) is a 1971 Hindi crime drama film produced and directed by Sunil Dutt and starring Waheeda Rehman as Reshma and Sunil Dutt as Shera. It also stars Vinod Khanna, Amitabh Bachchan, Raakhee, Ranjeet, K.N. Singh, Jayant and Amrish Puri in supporting roles. Sunil Dutt's son Sanjay Dutt, who was 12 years at the time, appears briefly as a Qawwali singer in his first film appearance.

Reshma Aur Shera received high critical acclaim from domestic and international critics and was nominated for the Golden Bear at the 22nd Berlin International Film Festival. It was selected as the Indian entry for the Best Foreign Language Film at the 44th Academy Awards, but was not accepted as a nominee.

Reshma Aur Shera won 3 awards at the 19th National Film Awards. Waheeda Rehman won the National Film Award for Best Actress for her highly-acclaimed performance in the film. The film also won the National Film Award for Best Music Direction for Jaidev and the National Film Award for Best Cinematography for Ramachandra.

Reshma Aur Shera was noted for its classic songs such as "Ek Meethi Si Chubhan, Ek Thandi Si Aggan" (lyrics by Udhav Kumar) and "Tu Chanda Main Chandni" (lyrics by Balkavi Bairagi).

Synopsis
Set against the backdrop of Rajasthan, Reshma (Rehman) and Shera (Dutt) love each other in the midst of a violent feud between their clans. When their families find out about their relationship, Chotu (Bachchan), Shera's mute sharpshooting brother carries out his father Sagat Singh's (Jayant) orders to kill Reshma's father (K. N. Singh) and her recently married brother Gopal (Ranjeet). Unable to bear the grief of Gopal's widowed bride (Raakhee), Shera kills his own father believing he actually pulled the trigger. After this tragedy, Reshma and Shera's family's feud will end in more tragedy as misunderstandings lead to more bloodshed between the clans.

Shera swears to kill Chotu and protect Reshma's family. Shera searches for Chotu, who hides in Reshma's house and seeks protection from her. The movie's climax is when Shera waits outside Reshma's house to kill Chotu. At the moment, Chotu and Reshma emerge from the house as a married couple. Shera notices sindoor on Reshma's forehead and realizes that he cannot kill Chotu since he is now her husband, thus ending the bloodshed. In his grief, Shera ends his own life using his rifle, just as Reshma to collapses after begging the skies to take her life away, with her corpse falling on that of Shera’s. As the two lovers lay dead in the desert, a windstorm takes plays, and buries their bodies within the sand.

Cast
 Waheeda Rehman as Reshma
 Sunil Dutt as Shera
 Amitabh Bachchan as Chhotu 
 Vinod Khanna as Vijay
 Raakhee as Reshma's Sister-in-law
 Ranjeet as Gopal 
 Jayant as Sagat Singh 
 K. N. Singh as Chaudhary 
 Amrish Puri as Rehmat Khan
 Sanjay Dutt as Qawwali Singer
 Naval Kumar as Jagat Singh

Music

19th National Film Awards 
 Best Actress - Waheeda Rehman
 Best Music Direction - Jaidev
 Best Cinematography - Ramachandra

See also
 List of submissions to the 44th Academy Awards for Best Foreign Language Film
 List of Indian submissions for the Academy Award for Best Foreign Language Film

References

External links

 

1971 films
1971 crime drama films
1970s Hindi-language films
Films featuring a Best Actress National Award-winning performance
Films directed by Sunil Dutt
Films whose cinematographer won the Best Cinematography National Film Award
Films scored by Jaidev
Films set in Rajasthan
Indian crime drama films